Dr. J. B. Martin (1885–1973) was president of the Negro American League and owned the Chicago American Giants baseball team.

Martin and his brother B. B. Martin were Memphis dentists with other business interests. One of these was the Memphis Red Sox. The brothers built Martin Park on Crump Boulevard, Memphis for the club, making the Red Sox one of the few clubs in the Negro leagues with their own ballpark.

Martin appointed Ted "Double Duty" Radcliffe as manager of the Chicago American Giants in 1950. He was concerned about black players joining Major League teams so he instructed Radcliffe to sign white players. Radcliffe recruited at least five young white players (Lou Chirban, Lou Clarizio, and others).  The team disbanded in 1952.

References

Baseball executives
Negro league baseball executives
1885 births
1973 deaths